Mingus is an album by the jazz bassist and composer Charles Mingus. The album was recorded in October and November 1960 in New York and released in late 1961 on Nat Hentoff's Candid label.

Background
At this time Mingus was working regularly with a piano-less quartet featuring Eric Dolphy, Ted Curson and Dannie Richmond, as heard on the Charles Mingus Presents Charles Mingus album also recorded in October 1960. The Mingus album features one track, "Stormy Weather", recorded by the same quartet, plus two tracks recorded by a larger group featuring piano and additional horns.

The track "M.D.M." weaves together the themes from three compositions: Duke Ellington's "Main Stem", Thelonious Monk's "Straight, No Chaser" and Mingus's own "Fifty-First Street Blues". The track "Lock 'Em Up" was inspired by a period of treatment that Mingus describes undergoing in his autobiography Beneath the Underdog, at New York's Bellevue psychiatric facility.

Track listings

Candid release 
"M.D.M. (Monk, Duke and Me)" – 19:49
"Stormy Weather"* – 13:23
"Lock 'Em Up (Hellview of Bellevue)" – 6:40

All compositions by Charles Mingus except * by Harold Arlen & Ted Koehler

Barnaby reissue 
In April, 1974, Barnaby Records reissued this album as Mingus: The Candid Recordings (KZ-31034), adding the track "Vasserlean", which had appeared only on a 1961 Candid Records various-artists collection called Jazz Life (CJM-8019/CJS-9019).
The new track listing was:

"M.D.M. (Monk, Duke and Me)" – 19:49
"Vasserlean" – 6:35
"Stormy Weather" – 13:23
"Lock 'Em Up (Hellview of Bellevue)" – 6:40

Jazz Man reissue 
In 1980, Jazz Man Records reissued this album under its original Candid title, Mingus (JAZ-5002), also including the track "Vasserlean." 
The track listing was:

"Stormy Weather" – 13:23
"Lock 'Em Up (Hellview of Bellevue)" – 6:40
"M.D.M. (Monk, Duke and Me)" – 19:49
"Vasserlean" – 6:35

Personnel 
 Charles Mingus – bass
 Ted Curson, Lonnie Hillyer – trumpet
 Jimmy Knepper, Britt Woodman – trombone
 Charles McPherson – alto saxophone
 Eric Dolphy – alto saxophone, flute and bass clarinet
 Booker Ervin – tenor saxophone
 Nico Bunink, Paul Bley – piano
 Dannie Richmond – drums

References 

1960 albums
Charles Mingus albums
Candid Records albums